Peter Kaumba (born 31 March 1958) is a Zambian football coach and former player. He was voted the best winger at CAN 1982 where Zambia came out third and was Zambian top player, top scorer and Sportsman of the Year in the same year. Kaumba's career was cut short by injury in 1984 and he became a coach, taking charge of several Zambian clubs.

Early life
Kaumba was born in Kitwe where his father White Kaumba was a miner. He supported Rhokana United (now Nkana FC) as a boy and his hero was Godfrey 'Ucar' Chitalu. Kaumba attended Wusakile and Misheshi primary schools and did his secondary education at Kitwe Boys Secondary School where he completed in 1976. He played as a left winger but occasionally played as a goalkeeper during the formative years of his career.

Club career
In 1971, Kaumba joined an amateur Team called UBZ which was sponsored by the United Bus Company of Zambia. He also played for Zambia Schools while at Kitwe Boys.

In 1975, he joined Mindola United and helped them win promotion to Division I the following season when they won the Division II championship and Kaumba was their top scorer with 39 goals. After a season in the top flight, Mindola were demoted and Kaumba decided to move to 1977 FAZ Division III winners Power Dynamos where he would go on to make a huge impact.

He helped Dynamos gain promotion to the First Division when they won the title, spending only one season in Division II and he won his first piece of silverware in a 7–6 penalty shoot-out Independence Cup win over Ndola United in October 1979.

The following year, Alex Chola joined Dynamos and formed one of the deadliest attacking partnerships in Zambian football with Kaumba. Dynamos, who were dubbed 'a baby born with teeth,' retained the Independence Cup with a 2–0 victory over Green Buffaloes. In the second minute of the game Kaumba scored the first goal, but had to withdraw with a dislocated arm five minutes into the second half.

Despite being an attacking midfielder, the tall Kaumba was a prolific goal-scorer. He could use his left foot with the same effect efficacy as his right, due to his decision to start practising shooting with his left foot as a boy. This enabled him to switch to the right wing without problems and his height was advantageous when it came to heading the ball at set-pieces and in open play.
 
Nicknamed '’Abaleya'’ – a popular call by Copperbelt mini-bus conductors to lure customers which means 'those who are going,' Kaumba made the Number 11 shirt famous. He was also called 'Africa' after his exploits at the CAN and also drew comparisons to Welsh star John Toshack.
In 1982, Dynamos had a good run in the African Cup Winners Cup with the fast and explosive Kaumba playing a key role. They reached the final only to lose to Egyptian side Arab Contractors. Kaumba emerged as the league's top-scorer with 35 goals for club and country, one ahead of club mate Chola and was rewarded with the Footballer of the Year award, as well as the Sportsman of the Year trophy. To date, he is the only man to win all three awards in the same season.
 
He was also the runner-up in the African Footballer of the Year award which was scooped by Camerounian goalkeeper Thomas N'kono. In his time with Dynamos, Kaumba won the league, the Independence Cup and the Champion of Champions Cup. He was also part of the Dynamos team that won the Rothman's Cup in 1983 in Ivory Coast. That same year, Zambian coach Wieslaw Grabowski described both Kaumba and Chola as world class players who had the potential to play for any division I team in Europe and observed that Kaumba was a brave warrior who used his speed although tended to play defensively at times. In 1983, Kaumba successfully attended trials with French second division side AS Cannes but while contract negotiations were going on, his agent told him of a 'better offer' in Ivory Coast and advised him to sign. So in December of that year, Kaumba and Chola signed three-year contracts with Ivorian club Africa Sports The duo made an impact but the stint only lasted 7 months due to the withdrawal of a major sponsor of the club. Both players returned to help Dynamos clinch their first ever league title in 1984. In August Kaumba suffered knee ligament damage in an independence cup semi-final against Kabwe Warriors at Kafubu Stadium in Luanshya which forced him to retire from football. Although he underwent an operation, he was advised to quit by doctors, a month before his 27th birthday.

International career
Kaumba was called up to the Zambia national team by Brian Tiler and he made a huge impression on his debut when he scored a last gasp goal in a CAN qualifier against Malawi on 15 April 1979 in Blantyre, in a 2–0 win after Chitalu had scored the opener.

A month before the Moscow Olympic Games, Kaumba suffered an injury in a friendly match against Zimbabwe in Lusaka which made him miss the tournament. In August 1981, Kaumba scored a crucial goal that qualified Zambia to CAN 1982 in a 2–0 victory over Morocco which gave Zambia a 3–2 aggregate victory.
Kaumba was Zambia's star performer at the tournament, scoring three goals, one less than the tournament's top scorer Ghana's George Alhassan. He was chosen among the eleven best players of the tournament by a panel of African Sports journalists who covered the tournament.  Later that year, Kaumba struck twice when Zambia beat Egypt 5–3 in Cairo to win the CAF Silver Jubilee tournament.

He scored against Egypt again in an Olympic Games qualifier in Lusaka on 9 October 1983 in a 1–0 win with a late goal off Chola's free-kick although Zambia lost the return leg 2–0 in Cairo. Kaumba quit football when his career was curtailed by a serious knee injury late in 1984 and took up coaching.

Coaching career
When his career ended, Kaumba concentrated on working for ZCCM Power Division in the Accounts Section until he was appointed assistant coach to Alex Chola at Dynamos in 1988, a position he held until 1989 when he was given the task of heading youth football at the club. In 1994, the Football Association of Zambia (FAZ) attached him to the U-20 National team as assistant coach.

When Dynamos coach Webby Chilufya was fired at the end of the 1996 season, the team's management was looking to bring in Fighton Simukonda but when they failed to prise him away from Konkola Blades F.C, they called upon Kaumba to lead the club as head coach. Appointed in early 1997, he led Dynamos to the league title after leading the table from the first day of the season to the last. The following year, he was relieved of his duties just four months after winning the league when Dynamos players reportedly revolted when they were left out of the home ownership empowerment scheme at ZCCM Power Division and management accused Kaumba of inciting the players.

He continued in his role as U-20 assistant coach and was part of Zambia's coaching bench at both the African Junior championship and the World Youth Cup in 1999 under Patrick Phiri.

When Green Buffaloes were faced with relegation following their return to the top flight in 1999, they hired Kaumba to replace George Chikokola and he managed to stave off relegation. In 2000, he guided Buffaloes to the final of the Mosi Cup which they lost to Nkana 7–6 on post-match penalties. He also led Buffaloes to a 6th-place finish.

The following season, Kaumba was surprisingly sidelined and replaced with Guston Mutobo with Buffaloes in second position with 7 wins, a draw and 3 defeats after 11 games in mid-June. Reasons given were that he did not heed advice from Buffaloes technical bench and often stuck to his favourite players regardless of their form to which Kaumba responded that he was the coach who was always with the players during training and was therefore responsible for picking the team. Kaumba's departure led to a number of players expressing interest in leaving Buffaloes as he was very popular with the players. It also began a slide and by September, the team was in eighth position on the table with only one win in 9 league matches, prompting the dismissal of the man who had done away with Kaumba's services Lt. Colonel Dan Chambaila, and Mutobo, leading to the return of Kaumba who expressed happiness at the move saying it was just a matter of hard work and dedication and all that was needed was to psyche the players.

In May 2002, Kaumba resigned from Buffaloes barely 6 weeks into the new season, in an apparent response to pressure from fans, who harassed him after his team lost to lowly Zamsure in Lusaka. The club were disappointed by his move but stated that they would not stand in his way.  
He took over at Kitwe United on their return to the top league after 25 years and led them to 7th position at the end of the season. Two seasons later, Kaumba masterminded a BP Top 8 Cup final win in a 1–0 victory over favourites Zanaco in Lusaka, ending a 35-year drought and dedicated the sweet victory to the club's supporters and sponsors. Kaumba also doubled as coach of the U-23 national team and took them to the semi-finals of the 2003 All Africa Games in Abuja, Nigeria with a talented squad which had players like Christopher Katongo, Kennedy Mweene, Stophira Sunzu, Kalililo Kakonje, Isaac Chansa and Collins Mbesuma. He was also elevated to assistant coach at senior national team under Patrick Phiri.

Kaumba had the opportunity to coach Tanzanian club Simba S.C. but he declined the offer when it did not meet his expectations.

When United dropped to Division II in 2006, Kaumba moved to newly promoted Zamtel the following year but after six points from 11 games, his contract was terminated with the team at the bottom of the log. In his stint there, Kaumba encountered a lot of interference and on a number occasions, officials at the club would buy players he had not even recommended.

He concentrated on coaching the U-23 national team though Zambia lost to Ivory Coast in the Beijing 2008 race. He once again led the team to the semi-finals of the 2007 All Africa Games in Algeria. The following year, he took charge of the Zambian CHAN team on temporary basis in qualifying matches against Swaziland and Botswana. He coached Konkola Blades in 2009 but resigned after six months after facing more interference in his duties and at times, going for months without getting paid.

When NAPSA Stars won promotion to the FAZ Premier League in 2011, Kaumba joined them as assistant coach to Patrick Phiri. In October 2012, Phiri was sidelined and Kaumba took over the reins as acting coach, and won the Barclays Cup in 4–2 penalty shootout after poor defending by both teams culminated in a 4–4 draw at full-time.

The following year, NAPSA flirted with relegation and ended the season one place and three points above the relegation zone. At the end of the season, Kaumba left his role as coach in what the club called an 'amicable parting of company.'

Personal life
Kaumba is a widower after losing his wife in 2001. He has three children – Jennings, Womba and Charles.

Honours

Player
Zambian Division II League Title: 1976, 1978
Independence Cup: 1979, 1980
Champion of Champions: 1980, 1981
Rothmans Cup: 1983
Zambian League Title: 1984

Zambia
CAF Silver Jubilee Tournament (Cairo)

Coach
Zambian league title: 1997
Zambian BP Top Eight Cup: 2004
Barclays Cup: 2012

Individual
Zambian Footballer of the Year: 1982
Zambian League Top Scorer: 1982
Zambian Sportsman of the Year: 1982
Runner-up African footballer of the Year: 1982

References

1958 births
Living people
Zambian footballers
Association football wingers
Zambia international footballers
1982 African Cup of Nations players
Power Dynamos F.C. players
Zambian football managers